Patrizia Caccamo (born 12 March 1984) is an Italian football forward currently playing for UD Collerense in the Spanish Segunda División Pro. She has also played for Gravina and Riviera di Romagna in Serie A and for Virtus Romagna, Acese, Sezze and Napoli in lower tiers. She has won one championship and one cup, and she is a member of the Italian national team.

References

External links
 

1984 births
Living people
Italian women's footballers
Italy women's international footballers
Serie A (women's football) players
Women's association football forwards
Fiorentina Women's F.C. players